Ángel Torres may refer to:

 Ángel Torres (baseball) (born 1952), Major League Baseball pitcher
 Ángel Torres (footballer, born 1952), Colombian footballer
 Ángel Torres (footballer, born 2000), Colombian footballer
 Ángel Torres (author) (1928–2010), author, historian and sportswriter
 Ángel Víctor Torres (born 1966), Spanish politician